Golujeh (also Romanized as Golūjeh; also known as Golījeh) is a village in Kaghazkonan-e Shomali Rural District, Kaghazkonan District, Meyaneh County, East Azerbaijan Province, Iran. At the 2006 census, its population was 78, in 23 families.

References 

Populated places in Meyaneh County